Cameraria leucothorax is a moth of the family Gracillariidae. It is known from California and Oregon in the United States.

The wingspan is about 8.5 mm.

The larvae feed on Lithocarpus densiflorus, Quercus chrysolepis and Quercus densiflora var. echinoides. They mine the leaves of their host plant. The mine is found on the underside of the leaf. The larva consumes the entire leaf substance within the mine and at maturity creates several folds in the lower epidermis between which numerous fine wrinkles can be found.

References

Cameraria (moth)
Moths described in 1907

Leaf miners
Lepidoptera of the United States
Moths of North America
Taxa named by Thomas de Grey, 6th Baron Walsingham